Veronika Kapshay (born 2 December 1986) is a Ukrainian former tennis player.

Kapshay won three singles titles and 23 doubles titles on the ITF Circuit. On 14 May 2012, she reached her best singles ranking of world No. 227. On 20 April 2009, she peaked at No. 114 in the doubles rankings.

ITF Circuit finals

Singles: 9 (3 titles, 6 runner-ups)

Doubles: 51 (23 titles, 28 runner-ups)

External links
 
 

1986 births
Living people
Sportspeople from Lviv
Ukrainian female tennis players
21st-century Ukrainian women